The following is the list of Syrian Premier League top scorers by season. The latest top scorer is Mohammed Al Wakid of Tishreen SC, who scored 21 goals in 2021–22.

Winners

References

Top
Syria
Association football player non-biographical articles